Black Country Healthcare NHS Foundation Trust is an NHS foundation trust which provides mental health services in Sandwell and Wolverhampton, specialist health services for people with learning disabilities in Dudley, Walsall, Sandwell and Wolverhampton and community healthcare services in Dudley.

Bob Piper has been the chairman of the trust since 2004.  It became a foundation trust in 2009.  Half the board members are black and minority ethnic, the only trust in England to achieve that.

The trust was given £89,000 from the Nursing Technology Fund in March 2014 which is to be spent on mobile devices.

The trust, together with Dudley and Walsall Mental Health Partnership NHS Trust has set up a  Liaison and Diversion service. The intention is that "when someone in a police station, or involved in court proceedings, has a mental health problem or other vulnerabilities, they are referred to the right services and are given support and guidance based on their needs."

An inspection by the Care Quality Commission in 2016 found that Abbey ward, Charlemont ward and Friar ward at Hallam Street Hospital, West Bromwich all had blind spots. The wards were said to be in a ‘poor state’ with stained and damaged walls, carpets and furniture and an ‘unpleasant odour throughout the ward areas’.  They found a number of areas of good practice. "This included how young people were involved in making decisions about their care and that the trust had also employed a nurse who spoke four Asian languages to lead on work with black and minority ethnic communities."

It planned to merge with Birmingham Community Healthcare NHS Foundation Trust and Dudley and Walsall Mental Health Partnership NHS Trust in October 2017.  The new organisation would have an annual turnover of around £440 million – making it the third biggest mental health trust in England.  The three way merger collapsed but the merger with Dudley and Walsall is still planned for 2020.

See also
 List of NHS trusts

References

External links 
 

NHS foundation trusts
Health in the West Midlands (county)